Anchorage, Alaska  (Dena'ina: Dgheyay Kaq'; Dgheyaytnu) has a subarctic climate with the code Dfc according to the Köppen climate classification due to its short, cool summers.  The weather on any given day is very unpredictable. Some winters feature several feet of snow and cold temperatures, while the summers are typically mild but are cool compared to the contiguous US and interior Alaska. Because of Anchorage's high latitude, summer days are very long and winter daylight hours are very short. The longest day of sunlight being 18hrs and 21 minutes, and shortest being 5 hours and 28 minutes. Anchorage is often cloudy during the winter, which decreases the amount of sunlight experienced by residents.

Temperature

Averages 

Average daytime summer temperatures range from approximately 55 to 78 °F (12.8 to 25.6 °C); average daytime winter temperatures are about 5 to 30 °F (−15.0 to −1.1 °C). Anchorage has a frost-free growing season that averages slightly over one hundred days.  Average January low and high temperatures at Ted Stevens Anchorage International Airport (PANC) are 11 / 23 °F (−11.7 / −5.0 °C) with an average winter snowfall of 75.59 inches, or 1.92 meters. Farther afield at the Campbell Airstrip is another weather station recording colder night temperatures in both summer and winter.

Average July low and high temperatures are 52 / 66 °F (11.1 / 18.9 °C) and the hottest reading ever recorded was 90 °F or 32.2 °C on July 4, 2019.

Precipitation

Rainfall 
Between 2000 and 2022 the annual rainfall in Anchorage was 16.7 inches. The months with the highest average mean of rain were August and September, each having an annual mean of 2.75 inches (August) and 3.24 inches (September).

Snowfall 

For snowfall, the annual mean average for 2000 to 2022 was 76.4 inches; the highest snowfall season being 2011 - 2012 with 134.5 inches, and the lowest season being 25.1 inches in 2015.

Climate change 
The mayor and the assembly of Anchorage in 2019 issued a climate action plan for the anticipated effects that climate change will have on its city and people.  The action plan includes all of the municipality of Anchorage, as far north as Eklutna and as south as Portage. One of the major goals of the climate action plan is to reduce green house gas emissions by 80% by the year 2050 from its 2008 emission levels. The first annual report on this came out in 2021. For its near term plans, the city also introduced a plan called the "Municipality of Anchorage Climate Action Strategy." This appears to be a document for a broader audience of people so it is easier for them to understand what will go into these climate action plans. In comparison, the Anchorage Climate Action plan is 108 pages long, whereas the Municipality of Anchorage Climate Action Strategy is just 12 pages.

Notable climate events 
Due to its proximity to active volcanoes, ash hazards are a significant, though infrequent, occurrence. The most recent notable incident was an August 1992 eruption of Mt. Spurr, which is located 78 mi (126 km) west of the city. The eruption deposited about 3 mm (0.12 in) of volcanic ash on the city. The cleanup of ash resulted in excessive demands for water and caused major problems for the Anchorage Water and Wastewater Utility.

On March 17, 2002, there was a storm that caused 28.6 in of snow to close schools for two days. The storm broke the city record for the most snowfall in a single day. The storm beat the previous record from 1955 on March 16, which was just 15.6 inches. The National Weather Service also recorded this same snow data.

Classifications

Trends in temperature, precipitation, and daylight hours

NWS office/international airport

Campbell airstrip

Notes

References

Anchorage, Alaska
Anchorage
Geography of Anchorage, Alaska